Painless Parker (born Edgar R.R. Parker; 1872–1952) was a Canadian-born street dentist described as "a menace to the dignity of the profession" by the American Dental Association. However, "Much of what he championed—patient advocacy, increased access to dental care, and advertising—has come to pass in the U.S."

Parker was born in Tynemouth Creek, New Brunswick, Canada. He studied at Acadia University in Wolfville, Nova Scotia and the Baptist Seminary in St. Martins, New Brunswick, but was expelled from both. He worked as a cook on a ship and as a travelling merchant before deciding to pursue medicine. Finding the costs prohibitive, he instead enrolled at the New York College of Dentistry. While in New York, he began offering his services through door-to-door dentistry, but when the college found out, he was expelled. From there, he went to the Philadelphia Dental College, which would become the Temple University School of Dentistry. He earned his diploma in 1892. He returned to New Brunswick to start work as a dentist. After six weeks without a single patient, he decided to advertise. He hired one of P.T. Barnum's ex-managers to help him take his practice on the road. Parker travelled across Canada before finally settling in Brooklyn, New York, in the late 1890s. He created the Parker Dental Circus, a traveling medicine show with his dental chair on a horse-drawn wagon while a band played. The band attracted large crowds and hid the moans and cries of patients who were given whiskey or a cocaine solution that he called "hydrocaine" to numb the pain. He charged 50 cents for each extraction and promised that if it hurt, he would pay the patient $5. 

At one point, he claimed to have pulled 357 teeth in one day, which he wore on a necklace. He legally changed his first name to "Painless" when he was accused of breaking a false advertisement law by claiming that his dentistry was truly painless. When business thrived, he hired assistants and established a chain dentistry business. In the end, Parker ran 28 West Coast dental offices, employing over 70 dentists, and grossing $3 million per year.

Parker is mentioned in the song "Orange Claw Hammer" by musician and poet Don Van Vliet. The Historical Dental Museum at the Temple University School of Dentistry has a display dedicated to Parker, with his necklace of 357 teeth and a large wooden bucket filled to the brim with teeth that he had personally pulled. The bucket of teeth sat by his feet as he lectured the crowds on the importance of dental hygiene.

References

Further reading
"Early Adventures of Painless Parker" by Peter M. Pronych and Arden G. Christen, Miramichi Books, Canada.
"The Adventures of Painless Parker", a web comic, by Zoe Piel
"The Saga of Painless Parker", the Dentistry iQ Network
"Painless Parker: Part dentist, part showman, all American", BBC Magazine 11 May 2015
"Street Dentist Painless Parker", an American history podcast, by Dave Anthony and Gareth Reynolds
Painless Parker, A Dental Renegade's Fight to Make Advertising Ethical by Arden G. Christen and Peter M. Pronych (self published book, published 1995) printed in Canada 492p.  (out of print)

American dentists
1872 births
1952 deaths